Stockholm Airport may refer to:

Sweden

Active airports
Stockholm Arlanda Airport (ARN/ESSA), the city's main international airport
Stockholm Bromma Airport (BMA/ESSB)
Stockholm Skavsta Airport (NYO/ESKN)
Stockholm Västerås Airport (VST/ESOW)

Defunct airports
Barkarby Airport (ESKB), closed in 2010

Papua New Guinea
Stockholm Airport (Papua New Guinea) (SMP)